Sayn was a small German county of the Holy Roman Empire which, during the Middle Ages, existed within what is today Rheinland-Pfalz.

There have been two Counties of Sayn. The first emerged in 1139 and became closely associated with the County of Sponheim early in its existence. Count Henry II was notable for being accused of satanic orgies by the Church's German Grand Inquisitor, Conrad von Marburg, in 1233. Henry was acquitted by an assembly of bishops in Mainz, but Conrad refused to accept the verdict and left Mainz. It is unknown whether it was Henry's Knights who killed Conrad on his return to Thuringia, but investigation was foregone due to the cruelty of Conrad, despite Pope Gregory IX ordering his murderers to be punished. With the death of Henry in 1246, the County passed to the Counts of Sponheim-Eberstein and thence to Sponheim-Sayn in 1261.

The second County of Sayn emerged as a partition of Sponheim-Sayn in 1283 (the other partition being Sayn-Homburg). It was notable for its numerous co-reigns, and it endured until 1608 when it was inherited by the Counts of Sayn-Wittgenstein-Sayn. A lack of clear heirs of William III of Sayn-Wittgenstein-Sayn led to the temporary annexation of the comital territories by the Archbishop of Cologne until the succession was decided. In 1648 following the Thirty Years' War, the County was divided between Sayn-Wittgenstein-Sayn-Altenkirchen and Sayn-Wittgenstein-Hachenburg.

Counts of Sayn (1139–1246) 
 Eberhard I (1139–76)
 Henry I/II (1176–1203) with…
 Eberhard II (1176–1202) with…
 Henry II/III (1202–46)
 Godfrey II/III, Count of Sponheim (Regent, 1181–1220)
 John I, Count of Sponheim-Starkenburg (Regent, 1226–1246)
 Mechtilde (fl. 1278-1282)

Counts of Sayn (1283–1608) 
 John I (1283–1324)
 John II (1324–59)
 John III (1359–1403)
 Gerard I (1403–19)
 Theodore (1419–52)
 Gerard II (1452–93)
 Gerard III (1493–1506) with…
 Sebastian I (1493–98) with…
 John IV (1498–1529)
 John V (1529–60) with…
 Sebastian II (1529–73) with…
 Adolph (1560–68) with…
 Henry IV (1560–1606) with…
 Herman (1560–71)
 Anna Elizabeth (1606–08)

See also 

 Sayn-Homburg
 Sayn-Wittgenstein
 Sayn-Wittgenstein-Berleburg
 Sayn-Wittgenstein-Hachenburg
 Sayn-Wittgenstein-Hohenstein
 Sayn-Wittgenstein-Karlsburg
 Sayn-Wittgenstein-Ludwigsburg
 Sayn-Wittgenstein-Sayn
 Sayn-Wittgenstein-Sayn-Altenkirchen
 Sayn-Wittgenstein-Vallendar
 Sponheim-Sayn

References

1605 disestablishments
States and territories established in the 11th century
History of the Rhineland
Former states and territories of Rhineland-Palatinate
History of the Westerwald